Tatia is a genus of small South American catfishes belonging to Auchenipteridae, the driftwood catfish family.

Species
There are currently 17 recognized species in this genus:
 Tatia aulopygia Kner, 1858
 Tatia boemia W. R. Koch & R. E. dos Reis, 1996
 Tatia brunnea Mees, 1974
 Tatia carolae Vari & Ferraris, 2013 
 Tatia caxiuanesis Sarmento-Soares & Martins-Pinheiro, 2008
 Tatia dunni Fowler, 1945
 Tatia galaxias Mees, 1974
 Tatia gyrina C. H. Eigenmann & W. R. Allen, 1942
 Tatia intermedia Steindachner, 1877
 Tatia jaracatia Pavanelli & Bifi, 2009
 Tatia marthae Vari & Ferraris, 2013 
 Tatia meesi Sarmento-Soares & Martins-Pinheiro, 2008
 Tatia melanoleuca Vari & Calegari, 2014 
 Tatia musaica Royero-L., 1992 
 Tatia neivai R. Ihering (pt), 1930
 Tatia nigra Sarmento-Soares & Martins-Pinheiro, 2008
 Tatia strigata Soares-Porto, 1995

In addition to the described species, an undescribed species of Tatia that closely resembles Tatia musaica is often sold in the tropical fish hobby. This undescribed form is known as Ninja Tatia. This ninja Tatia has some white spots on the upper black-colored body and more white on the tail fin, compared to Tatia musaica.

References

Auchenipteridae
Fish of South America
Catfish genera
Taxa named by Alípio de Miranda-Ribeiro